The Tanjong Kindana Royal Mausoleum is a Royal Mausoleum located at the former capital of Negara Brunei Darussalam, Tanjong Kindana or also known as Tanjong Chendana. The Mausoleum served as the burial place of Sultan Muhammad Hassan, the 9th Sultan of Brunei who reigned from 1582 until his death in 1598.

Accessibility
The Royal Mausoleum can be reached by boat from Kampong Sungai Besar which is near to Tanjong Kindana.

References

Buildings and structures in Brunei
Mausoleums in Brunei